In military aviation, scrambling is the act of quickly mobilising military aircraft. Scrambling can be in reaction to an immediate threat, usually to intercept hostile aircraft.

Battle of Britain
The term was used during the Battle of Britain, when Royal Air Force pilots and their fighters were readied and available to fly. Detection and monitoring of enemy aircraft, e.g. by the Chain Home radar stations, would feed into the RAF Fighter Command's Dowding system for control and management of the defenses. Once a decision had been made to intercept the enemy formation a telephone call would be made to the chosen fighter squadron's airfield, and those air crews available would be scrambled. The scramble order was communicated to alert pilots waiting by their aircraft by the loud ringing of a bell.
Every minute lost before takeoff would be advantageous to the enemy, as it could allow a pilot to gain extra height above the advancing plane formations.

Unidentified aircraft were known as bogeys, and known enemy ones were called bandits.

Cold War

During the Cold War, many NATO air forces had crews stationed in Europe on alert and scrambled whenever their airspace was penetrated. The rudimentary bell-ringing communication was eventually replaced by electronic radio communication methods. However, many fighter squadrons into the current era would keep a bell at their squadron bar in legacy to the Battle of Britain roots. A common tradition was that anyone at the bar who rang the bell would be required to buy a round of drinks for all present. 

Both interceptors and nuclear bomber forces were kept on "Quick Reaction Alert" (QRA). Crews were kept close to or in their aircraft, which were expected to be able to take off within a short period, such as 15 minutes, in less-than-normal situations. It could be only two minutes at times of heightened tension between the opposing powers.

See also
Combat readiness
Minimum Interval Takeoff
Interceptor aircraft
Ground-controlled interception
Glossary of RAF code names

References

External links
 Air Ministry "Scramble" Bell

Aerial warfare
Battle of Britain